Myotragus (Neo-Latin, derived from the Greek: ,  and  "Balearian mouse-goat"), is an extinct genus of goat-antelope in the tribe Caprini which lived on the Balearic Islands of Mallorca and Menorca in the western Mediterranean until its extinction around 4,500 years ago. The fossil record of Myotragus on the Balearic Islands extends over 5 million years back to the early Pliocene on Mallorca, where it presumably arrived after the evaporation of the Mediterranean Sea during the Messinian Salinity Crisis. Myotragus is represented by six sequential chronospecies representing gradual change in morphology. The youngest and best known species, M. balearicus, is noted for a number of unusual morphological adaptions, including forward facing eyes suggestive of binocular vision, and a reptilian-like physiology. Early genetic research suggested that it was closely related to sheep of the genus Ovis, however more recent research has indicated that its closest living relative is the takin (Budorcas taxicolor). M. balearicus became extinct when humans arrived in the Balearic Islands during the 3rd millennium BC.

History of disovery and taxonomy 
The first remains of Myotragus were described by Dorothea Bate in 1909. Bate had been sent a letter by Robert Ashington Bullen, who informed her about a bone-bearing breccia deposit on the east of Mallorca, which prompted her to survey the island for Pleistocene aged cave deposits. Three such deposits were found, which yielded fragmentary remains of Myotragus, including a mostly complete skull, associated with a mandible and atlas vertebra, which was designated the type specimen of the new species and genus Myotragus balearicus. In 1915, Charles William Andrews described more material discovered in the intervening years, including material that had been discovered on Menorca.

Species 
Six sequential chronospecies of Myotragus have been named, representing 5 million years of gradual accumulated morphological change, including a reduction in body size and changes to the locomotor system, the teeth and the visual system.
M. palomboi Bover, Quintana & Alcover, 2010 Early Pliocene, Mallorca
M. pepgonellae Moyà-Solà & Pons-Moyà, 1982 Middle Pliocene, Mallorca
M. antiquus Pons-Moyà, 1977 Late Pliocene, Mallorca
M. kopperi Moya & Pons, 1980 Early Pleistocene, Mallorca
M. batei Crusafont & Angel, 1966 Middle Pleistocene, Mallorca, Menorca
M. balearicus Bate, 1909 Late Pleistocene-Holocene, Mallorca, Menorca
The species M. binigausensis Moyà-Solà and Pons-Moyà, 1980 from the Pleistocene of Menorca has been synonymised with M. batei.

Description

The size of Myotragus varied between species, generally reducing with time. The early species M. pepgonellae is estimated to have had a body mass of approximately 60 kg, while the later M. kopperi is estimated to have been approximately 23 kg, representing an example of insular dwarfism. M. balearicus is estimated to have been approximately 50 cm tall at the shoulder, with a 2004 study esimating an adult body mass of ~23–32 kg. The orbits of the skull of M. balearicus are roughly half the size those of other comparably sized caprines, and face-foward as opposed to the sides as in most ungulates, allowing for binocular vision. The skull had a pair of small posteriorly-directed horns. The species of Myotragus show a sequential reduction in the number of teeth through time, with M. balearicus having an adult dentition comprising a single ever-growing incisor, one premolar, and three molars in each half of the lower jaw, and two premolars and three molars in each half of the upper jaw. By contrast, the earliest species had three incisors, one canine, and two premolars each half of the lower jaw, as is typical of most ruminants, with the incisors not being ever-growing, and a third premolar present in each half of the upper jaw. The teeth in the later species are much more hypsodont (high crowned) than in earlier species. The limbs of M. balearicus are relatively short in comparison to other caprines, with the tarsals, metatarsals and sesamoids being partially fused.

Paleobiology

Diet 
While tooth morphology and tooth texture suggests that some earlier Myotragus species may have been grazers or mixed feeders, preserved coprolites of M. balearicus indicates that it was likely predominantly a browser, and heavily dependent on the native boxwood species Buxus balearica for a large part of its diet. The increased hypsodonty over time of the teeth of Myotragus likely represents at least in part an adaptation to the increased consumption of abrasive food.

Physiology and growth 
The bone histology of M. balearicus shows lamellar-zonal tissue throughout the cortex, a feature otherwise typical of ectothermic reptiles. The growth of bones in M. balearicus is unlike any other mammal and similar to crocodilians in showing slow and adaptive rates, intermittently ceasing growth altogether, and reaching somatic and probably sexual maturity at 12 years of age. This pattern of growth indicates that Myotragus, in the same way as extant reptiles, adapted its metabolism to changing food and water availability, and ambient temperatures. Newborn specimens of M. balearicus are estimated to have been approximately 15-18 cm in height with a weight of about 700-900 grams, approximately 2% the bodymass of a mature adult, much lower than that of a typical ruminant, which are usually over 4% the adult bodymass.

Analysis of the high-crowned teeth of M. balearicus, shows that they grew more slowly than those of other caprines, with their last teeth erupting at approximately six years of age, likely as an adaption to their longevity. Based on skeletochronology and dental durability analysis, some individuals of M. balearicus are likely to have reached a lifespan of 27 years. The estimated mortality rates are substantially lower than those found for other members of Bovidae, with a large proportion of individuals surviving into old age.

Movement 
An analysis of the phalangeal bones of M. balearicus found that the bones of the foot were tightly bound by ligaments and inelastic. This suggests that Myotragus was obligately a slow walker with a reduced step length, and lacked the ability to jump. The likely reason for this is as an energy saving measure, as the shock absorbing mechanism in the foot bones of other caprines requires large amounts of muscle energy. The proximal and medial phalanges were likely orientated vertically relative to the ground surface, which reduced bending stresses.

Senses 
The cranial endocast of M. balearicus indicates that the areas of the brain and structures associated with vision, sound and smell were strongly reduced when compared with other caprines, with the brain only being the half size of other comparably sized caprines. These likely represent optimisations to the animals energy budget, which were unnecessary in the absence of terrestrial predators.

Evolution
The closest fossil relatives of Myotragus are uncertain. A close relationship has been proposed to the genera Aragoral and Norbertia from the Late Miocene of mainland Europe, as well as the insular genera Ebusia from the Pliocene of Ibiza, and Nesogoral from the Early Pleistocene of Sardinia. A 2005 study of a partial mitochrondrial genome suggested that Myotragus was the sister group to the genus Ovis, which includes sheep. However, analysis of a complete mitochondrial genome of M. balearicus published in 2019 found that its closest living relative is the takin (Budorcas taxicolor), native to the eastern Himalayas with an estimated divergence around 7.1 million years ago. A cladogram showing its position within Caprinae/Caprini is given below.

The ancestor of Myotragus likely arrived in the Balearic Islands during the Messinian stage of the late Miocene at a time at which the Strait of Gibraltar closed and the Mediterranean Sea evaporated, reducing sea level within the basin by 800–1200 metres, in an event called the Messinian salinity crisis, allowing dispersal from the Iberian Peninsula to the Balearics.

Later on, the re-opening of the straits and the refilling of the Mediterranean at the beginning of the Pliocene isolated the animal populations on the islands. The anagenic changes in morphology Myotragus developed over the course of its evolution were probably driven by resource limitation on the relatively resource poor Balearics, with the lack of competitors leading to increased intraspecific competition, and the absence of effective predators meaning the population would periodically outstrip the carrying capacity of the islands, resulting in the denudation of most vegetation and consequently mass starvation, with only a small proportion of the population surviving a starvation episode, leading to strong selection pressure.

Myotragus initially only colonized the island of Mallorca. Only a handful of mammal species aside from Myotragus were able to colonise the island, including shrews, hamsters, dormice, murids and rabbits. By the Late Pliocene, Myotragus represented only one of three genera of mammal present on Mallorca, alongside the giant dormouse Hypnomys and the shrew Nesiotites, all of which would continue to be present on the island until the Holocene. On Menorca, a giant rabbit, Nuralagus rex evolved that covered the same niche as Myotragus in Mallorca. With the level of the sea falling due to glacial cycles during the Pleistocene, Mallorca and Menorca were periodically connected and the mammals of Mallorca, including Myotragus colonised Menorca, replacing the great Menorcan lagomorphs. Both islands separated again at the beginning of the Holocene.

Extinction
Diverse datings indicate that the three native terrestrial mammals of Mallorca and Menorca (Myotragus balearicus, the giant dormouse Hypnomys and the large shrew Nesiotites hidalgo) disappeared all in the same very short period of time, during the third millennium BC. Historically there was debate as to whether the extinctions were caused by climate change, or whether they were exterminated by the first human settlers of the Balearic Islands.

The dominant theory is the one that postulates an extinction by human causes. Traditional methods had dated the first human colonization of the Balearic Islands towards 5000 BC or even before, but subsequent tests with modern methods of dating clearly indicate that there was no human presence before 3000 BC. This date agrees very closely with the fast decline of the three forms. The youngest remains of Myotragus date to around 2632 calibrated years BC, while the minimum date of human arrival on the Balearic Islands is currently 2282 BC. Extinction was likely rapid within less than 100 years of human arrival on the islands.

In 1969 it was suggested that Myotragus shows signs of domestication but a 2001 study found that there was no empirical evidence supporting the idea, with marks on Myotragus horns that were suggested to be made by humans likely as a result of gnawing on bones by other Myotragus, likely for their mineral content.

See also
List of extinct animals of Europe
Messinian salinity crisis
Schultz's rule
Zanclean flood

References

Prehistoric caprids
Prehistoric mammals of Europe
Endemic fauna of the Balearic Islands
Holocene extinctions
Fossil taxa described in 1909
Prehistoric even-toed ungulate genera